Mörel may refer to:

 Mörel, Germany, municipality in Schleswig-Holstein
 Mörel, Switzerland a former municipality in Valais, now part of Mörel-Filet